The men's marathon at the 1974 European Athletics Championships was held in Rome, Italy, on 8 September 1974.

Medalists

Results

Final
8 September

Participation
According to an unofficial count, 30 athletes from 16 countries participated in the event.

 (3)
 (1)
 (3)
 (2)
 (1)
 (2)
 (1)
 (1)
 (1)
 (2)
 (3)
 (2)
 (3)
 (1)
 (3)
 (1)

References

Marathon
Marathons at the European Athletics Championships
Euro
1974 European Athletics
Men's marathons